The Scottish Social Services Council is responsible for raising standards in the country's social service workforce.

The Scottish Social Services Council (SSSC) was established in October 2001 by the Regulation of Care (Scotland) Act and is responsible for registering people who work in the social services and regulating their education and training.

Objectives

to protect those who use services 
to raise standards of practice 
to strengthen and support the professionalism of the workforce

Responsibilities

to set up registers of key groups of social service staff 
to publish Codes of Practice for social service workers and employers 
to regulate the training and education of the workforce 
to promote education and training 
to undertake the function of Skills for Care and Development.

Registration
The Register of Social Service Workers opened on 1 April 2003, with social workers being the first group of workers to register. In 2014 there are now 60,000 workers on the register.

The following social service workers will already be or will have to be registered with the SSSC in the future:

social workers
students on the social work honours degree and postgraduate programmes
Care Commission officers
all workers in residential child care services (this includes managers, supervisors and workers)
 managers of care home services for adults
managers of adult day care services
all workers in day care of children services
all workers in school care accommodation services
all other workers in care home services for adults
all workers in housing support services
managers of care at home services.

Codes of Practice 
The Codes of Practice for Social Service Workers is a list of statements that describe the standards of professional conduct and practice required of social service workers as they go about their daily work.  The revised Codes of Practice for Social Service Workers and Employers came into effect on 1 November 2016. The Codes set out the standards of practice and behaviour expected of social service workers and their employers.

The main changes in the updated codes reflect the SSSC move from a misconduct model to a fitness to practice model of regulation, and the inclusion of a duty of candour.

See also
 Social care in Scotland

References

External links
 

Welfare in Scotland
Social work organisations in the United Kingdom
2001 establishments in Scotland
Government agencies established in 2001
Social Services Council
Organisations based in Dundee
Social care in Scotland
Regulators of Scotland